Persoonia daphnoides is a plant in the family Proteaceae and is endemic to a restricted area in eastern Australia.

Description
Flowering occurs from December to January.

Taxonomy
Persoonia daphnoides was first formally described in 1830 by Robert Brown from an unpublished manuscript by Allan Cunningham. Brown's description was published in Supplementum primum Prodromi florae Novae Hollandiae.

Cunningham gave the type location as "near the Hunter's River" but Peter H. Weston and Lawrie Johnson consider that Cunningham's label is erroneus.

Distribution and habitat

References

daphnoides
Flora of New South Wales
Flora of Queensland
Plants described in 1830
Taxa named by Allan Cunningham (botanist)